Galina Alexeyevna Kulakova (born 29 April 1942) is a Soviet-Russian former cross-country skier, arguably the best skier on distances shorter than 10 km in the early 1970s. She won four Olympic golds, two individual in 1972 and two relay golds in 1972 and 1976. She was the most successful athlete at the 1972 Winter Olympics, along with Ard Schenk of the Netherlands. Competing in the World Championships, she won three individual golds, two in 1974 and one in 1970, and also two relay golds in those years. Kulakova also won the 10 km event at the Holmenkollen ski festival in 1970 and 1979. Galina Kulakova was also 39 times Champion of the USSR between 1969 and 1981.

For her achievements she was awarded the Order of Lenin and the Order of the Badge of Honour. She was also awarded the silver Olympic Order in 1984 by the International Olympic Committee President Juan Antonio Samaranch. Galina Kulakova ended her sports career in 1982.

Drug controversy
At the 1976 Winter Olympics in Innsbruck, Kulakova finished third in the 5 km event, but was disqualified due to a positive test for banned substance ephedrine. She claimed that this was a result of using the nasal spray that contained the substance. Both the International Ski Federation and the International Olympic Committee allowed her to compete in the 10 km and the 4 × 5 km relay.

Cross-country skiing results
All results are sourced from the International Ski Federation (FIS).

Olympic Games
 8 medals – (4 gold, 2 silver, 2 bronze)

World Championships
 10 medals – (5 gold, 3 silver, 2 bronze)

World Cup

Season standings

Team podiums
 1 podium

Note:   Until the 1999 World Championships, World Championship races were included in the World Cup scoring system.

See also
List of multiple Olympic gold medalists
List of multiple Winter Olympic medalists

References

External links
 
 Holmenkollen winners since 1892 – click Vinnere for downloadable pdf file 

1942 births
Living people
People from Udmurtia
Cross-country skiers at the 1968 Winter Olympics
Cross-country skiers at the 1972 Winter Olympics
Cross-country skiers at the 1976 Winter Olympics
Cross-country skiers at the 1980 Winter Olympics
Doping cases in cross-country skiing
Holmenkollen Ski Festival winners
Olympic cross-country skiers of the Soviet Union
Olympic gold medalists for the Soviet Union
Olympic silver medalists for the Soviet Union
Olympic bronze medalists for the Soviet Union
Russian female cross-country skiers
Russian sportspeople in doping cases
Soviet sportspeople in doping cases
Soviet female cross-country skiers
Olympic medalists in cross-country skiing
Recipients of the Olympic Order
Competitors stripped of Winter Olympics medals
FIS Nordic World Ski Championships medalists in cross-country skiing
Medalists at the 1976 Winter Olympics
Medalists at the 1980 Winter Olympics
Medalists at the 1972 Winter Olympics
Medalists at the 1968 Winter Olympics
Sportspeople from Udmurtia